SS Montfort Stokes (MC contract 2000) was a Liberty ship built in the United States during World War II. She was named after Montfort Stokes, an American politician who served as both North Carolina's Governor and Senator.

The ship was laid down on 16 July 1943 by the North Carolina Shipbuilding Company of Wilmington, North Carolina, then launched on 14 August 1943. The ship survived the war and was sold into private ownership in 1947.  She was scrapped in 1962.

References

Liberty ships
Ships built in Wilmington, North Carolina
1943 ships